Chaim Hezekiah Medini (Jerusalem 1834 – Hebron, 1904), also known by the title of his chief halakhic work, Sdei Chemed, was a rabbinical scholar during the nineteenth century.

Biography
His name was originally Hezekiah; Chaim, "life", was added during a period of serious illness. This led to his initials spelling Chacham, appropriately a play on words that also means a sage, although spelled differently it was pronounced similarly.

His parents were Jerusalem Rabbi Raphael Asher Eliyahu Medini and his wife Kalu Vida. He married his first wife Rivka at the age of eighteen, and studied Torah under the Rishon L’Tzion (Sephardic Chief Rabbi) Yitzchak Kubo and Rabbi Joseph Nissim Burla, the head of the Jerusalem rabbinical court. He received his ordination (semichah) at the age of 19. His father's sudden death in 1853 compelled Rabbi Haim Hezekiah to move to Constantinople where he and his family were supported by wealthy cousins, happy to have the great scholar amongst them. Even though his cousins were generous, he did not want to overburden them, so he also began to tutor children for a number of hours a day to make some income, devoting most of his time to Torah study. Although recognized as a scholar and offered a position on the city's rabbinical court, he refused, preferring to devote his time to study and writing. It was in Constantinople that he published his first work, Michtav L'Chizkiyahu in 1865 (5625). His recognition spread and eventually took its toll. He longed for peace and quiet to study and write. 

When traveling Jewish merchants from the Crimea offered him the rabbinate there, he accepted and moved to Kara-Su-Bazar (modern day Bilohirsk), in Crimea, where he served from 1867 until 1899, establishing a yeshiva and raising the level of observance of the community that had been without a rabbi for many years. He had one son and three daughters. His only son died in 1868 (5628) and Chaim Chizkiyahu wrote a sefer in memory of his son and called it Or Li ("Light Unto Me"), and published it in Smyrna in 5634 (1874). In humility the author published the book anonymously. It contains responsa and Talmudic interpretations. He also wrote a halachic work entitled Paku'ot Sadeh (Jerusalem, 1900) and Sefer Bakashot (Odessa, 1879) containing piyutim (liturgical poems) which Oriental Jewish communities included in their services on Shabbat and festivals. The latter was republished in an enlarged edition under the name Ne'im Zemirot (Warsaw, 1886). He is also the author of several collections of responsa which appeared in various books by other authors. 

During his 33 years in Kara-Su-Bazar he wrote the greater part of his chief work, the Sede Chemed, corresponding with sages around the world to clarify the laws as stated. This work is in form an encyclopedia of responsa, and was, together with Isaac Lampronti's Pachad Yitzchak, the main indexing resource for responsa until the emergence of modern resources such as the Talmudic Encyclopedia and the Otzar ha-Poskim database.

In 1899, Medini returned to the holy land, staying at first in Jerusalem for two years. Upon hearing that he was suggested as Rishon Letzion, Sephardi Chief Rabbi, he moved to Hebron in 1901, hoping to be allowed to study in peace. However, shortly after his arrival Hebron's two major Torah scholars, Eliyahu Mani and Yosef Franco, died and a search for a new chief rabbi of Hebron had begun. At first, Medini rejected all offers but eventually relented and served as chief rabbi there until his death in 1904. According to legend, he was greatly respected by both the Jewish and Arab communities in the city, so much so that after his passing, the Arab community attempted to steal his body and have it re-interred in a Muslim burial site instead. He lived in the Beit Romano building which today has a recreation of his study. The street has been named in his honor. In 2018 the Hezekiah neighborhood was issued final zoning permits named after him. His burial site in the ancient Jewish cemetery of Hebron can be viewed today. Sde Hemed, translated from Hebrew means "fields of grace", and is also the name of a moshav in central Israel near Kfar Saba and an elementary school in Maale Adumim.<ref>{{Cite web|url=http://www.sdeychemed.jedu.org.il/BRPortal/br/P100.jsp|title=ביס שדי חמד מעלה אדומים|website=www.sdeychemed.jedu.org.il|access-date=2018-10-23}}</ref>

WorksMiktav le-Hizkiyahu – Talmudic studies and responsa; Part 1, Part 2 (Smyrna, 1865).Or Li – responsa; (Smyrna, 1874).Paku'ot Sadeh – (Jerusalem, 1900).Sede Chemed – his chief work, a 9 volume encyclopedic collection of laws and decisions in alphabetical order (Warsaw, 1890). Vol. 1, Vol. 2, Vol. 3, Vol. 4, Vol. 5, Vol. 6, Vol. 7, Vol. 8, Vol. 9.
Pi'ot Hasadeh and Shiyurei Hapayah are the author's glosses on Sdei Chemed and are included in that work.
Sedar Birchat Hachamah and the author's living will were also published in Sdei Chemed

References

Bibliography in Sefer ha-Shanah'', by Nahum Sokolov, Warsaw, 1900.

1834 births
1904 deaths
Rabbis in Ottoman Palestine
Rabbis in Hebron
Rabbis in Jerusalem
Rabbis from Istanbul
Krymchaks
Exponents of Jewish law
Authors of books on Jewish law
19th-century rabbis from the Ottoman Empire